Michael Edwin Fyhrie (born December 9, 1969) is an American former professional baseball player who played five seasons for the New York Mets, Anaheim Angels, Chicago Cubs, and Oakland Athletics of Major League Baseball (MLB). He also pitched one season in Nippon Professional Baseball (NPB) for the Chiba Lotte Marines in 2003. The following year, he played for the Hyundai Unicorns in Korea where he sported a 16–6 record with a sub-3.00 earned run average.

References

External links

Career statistics and player information from Korea Baseball Organization

1969 births
Living people
Albuquerque Isotopes players
American expatriate baseball players in Canada
American expatriate baseball players in Japan
American expatriate baseball players in South Korea
Anaheim Angels players
Arizona League Cubs players
Baseball players from Long Beach, California
Buffalo Bisons (minor league) players
Chiba Lotte Marines players
Chicago Cubs players
Edmonton Trappers players
Eugene Emeralds players
Hyundai Unicorns players
Iowa Cubs players
KBO League pitchers
Major League Baseball pitchers
Memphis Chicks players
New York Mets players
Nippon Professional Baseball pitchers
Norfolk Tides players
Oakland Athletics players
Omaha Royals players
Sacramento River Cats players
UCLA Bruins baseball players
Wichita Wranglers players